Blackstock may refer to:

Places
Blackstock, Ontario, Canada
Blackstock Road, major road in north London, United Kingdom
Blackstock, South Carolina, United States

Other uses
Blackstock (surname)
Battle of Blackstock's Farm (1780), took place in what today is Union County, South Carolina, United States
Blackstock Knob, a summit in the Black Mountains, North Carolina, United States

See also
Blacklock, a surname
Blacksocks, a European sock subscription service